The 1924 Toledo Rockets football team was an American football team that represented Toledo University (renamed the University of Toledo in 1967) during the 1924 college football season. In their second season under head coach Pat Dwyer, the team compiled a 5–3 record. Gilbert Stick was the team captain.

Schedule

References

Toledo
Toledo Rockets football seasons
Toledo Rockets football